B2K: The Remixes – Volume 1 is B2K's second album. The album's name is the remixes they made from their last album. The album consists of a blend of R&B and Dance remixes recorded from their 2002 B2K self-titled album. It also features snippets and one song by  Jhené, who at the time was signed to TUG and promoted alongside B2K. The album was released on March 12, 2002 and debuted and peaked at #129. It has not been certified.

Track listing

 "Gots Ta Be" (Clue/Duro Remix) - 4:21
 "Uh Huh Pt. 2" (Featuring Nazkar) - 3:46
 "Gots ta Be" (Platinum Status Remix) - 2:57
 "Gots ta Be" (Allegro Love Remix) 3:47
 "My Name Is Jhene" (Intro) (Jhené) - 0:52
 "He Couldn't Kiss" (Album Version) (Jhené) - 3:49
 "Gonne Love You Anyway" (snippet)  (Jhené) - 1:33
 "Stuck Like This" (Snippet)  (Jhené) - 1:31
 "Back Up" (Album Version) - 3:09

 
2002 remix albums
Epic Records remix albums